Yves Lainé (born 1937) is a Breton lawyer, politician and companies executive manager, now a writer, arguing for the return of Loire-Atlantique departement in the administrative région of Brittany the reunification and devolution of the historical Brittany.

Born in 1937 in Nantes, he was a director of CELIB (Committee of Breton Interests) and worked as a director of the Nantes-Saint Nazaire Port Authority and Brittany Ferries. He founded the B5 association (B for Brittany and 5 for the 5 Breton departements : Finistère, Côtes-d'Armor, Morbihan, Ille-et-Vilaine and Loire-Atlantique) and also the vice president of Bretagne Réunie. He wrote L'ambition de Bretagne d'un Nantais in 2002. He is honorary chairman the Breton writers' association, ex-chairman of The Law and Institutions Department in the Institut Culturel de Bretagne (Skol Uhel ar Vro in Breton language). With another Nantes lobby les Transbordés  he proposes to rebuild a new hi-tech transporter bridge in the port within the frames of a Vernian loop (Jules Verne), open for tourism . A large 8 mths debate held by Nantes métropole on the maritime destiny of the town ended in September 2015 and approved many proposals made by Lainé.

Awards 

2012, Received the collar of the Breton Ermine order (ordre de l'Hermine). In June 12013 he was elected Chancellor of this Order.

Writings 

 Europe rends nous la mer (Europe give us back the sea) Sea-trade policy. Essay Ed.CELIB 1972
 1973-1993: vingt ans de navigation Brittany Ferries. Des romantiques aux leaders, Revue du Nord, 1995
 L'ambition de Bretagne d'un Nantais (A Nantais's ambition for Brittany),Essay, Petit Véhicule 2002 
 Désenclavement, un commencement ou une fin ?, in : Fanch Élégoët, Bretagne 2000, Plabennec, Tud Ha Bro, 1986, p. 75-97.
 De la pertinence de sociétés duales (Relevance of a dual society) Contribution World Human Rights Forum 2004 - On line at PlanetAgora.com
 Les ailes et le sang (Wings and blood) Historical novel about war 1914-18 Cheminement 2006; 
 Zouave & communard Historical novel 1870 Cheminement 2008
 Jean-Marie, Chouan de Bretagne (Jean-Marie, Insurgeant in Brittany) Historical novel 1800-1840 Ecrituriales 2012 
 Bretonnitude et autres celt'attitudes sur fond de Brexit . Essay Ecrituriales 2017

References 

1937 births
Living people
Writers from Nantes
Writers from Brittany
French male writers
Politicians from Nantes